The Fiery Angel is

 The Fiery Angel (novel), a novel by the Russian poet Valery Bryusov
 The Fiery Angel (opera), an opera by Sergei Prokofiev based on Bryusov's novel